109 Tauri, or n Tauri, is a single, yellow-hued star in the zodiac constellation of Taurus. It has an apparent visual magnitude of 4.96 and is faintly visible to the naked eye. At that distance, the visual magnitude is diminished by an extinction of 0.24 due to interstellar dust. It is moving further from the Sun with a heliocentric radial velocity of +19 km/s.

This is an evolved giant star with a stellar classification of G8 III, having consumed the hydrogen at its core and moved off the main sequence. At the age of 600 million years, it has become a red clump giant, indicating that it is on the horizontal branch and is generating energy through helium fusion at its core. The star has an estimated 2.47 times the mass of the Sun and has expanded to around eight times the Sun's radius. It is radiating about 60 times the Sun's luminosity from its enlarged photosphere at an effective temperature of 5,035 K.

References

G-type giants
Horizontal-branch stars
Taurus (constellation)
Tauri, n
Durchmusterung objects
Tauri, 109
034559
024822
1739